Caopu Subdistrict is a subdistrict situated in western Anning City, Yunnan province, southwestern China. Formerly a town, its status changed to a subdistrict of Anning in 2011. The subdistrict has many industrial enterprises.

References

Anning, Yunnan
Township-level divisions of Kunming